Horizon is a Hungarian film directed by Pál Gábor. It was released in 1971.

Cast
 Péter Fried - Karesz
 Lujza Orosz - Karesz anyja
 Szilvia Marossy - Ágnes
 József Madaras - Autószerelõ
 Zsuzsa Bognár - Rózsa
 Zoltán Vadász - Hajdú elvtárs
 Erzsi Hegedüs - Hajdúné
 Ferenc Baracsi - Götz tanár úr
 Ilona Gurnik - Asszistensnõ
 Ildikó Hámori - Titkárnõ
 Miklós Stern - Bajuszos pszichológus
 Hugó Szerencsi - Portás
 Ernõ Szénási - Tisztviselõ
 Sándor Szoboszlai - Szemüveges pszichológus
 György Vizi

References

External links
 

1971 films
1971 drama films
1970s Hungarian-language films
Films directed by Pál Gábor
Hungarian black-and-white films
Hungarian drama films